Kottweiler-Schwanden  is a municipality in the district of Kaiserslautern, in Rhineland-Palatinate, western Germany.

References

External links 
 The City of Kottweiler-Schwanden
 Kottweiler-Schwanden

Municipalities in Rhineland-Palatinate
Kaiserslautern (district)